Hamza Ziad (born 29 February 1988 in Batna) is an Algerian professional footballer. He currently plays as a midfielder for USM Khenchela in the Algerian Ligue Professionnelle 1.

Club career
On June 20, 2011, Ziad signed a two-year contract with JS Kabylie.

References

External links

Hamza Ziad profile at dzfoot.com

1988 births
Living people
Algerian footballers
MSP Batna players
Algerian Ligue Professionnelle 1 players
Algerian Ligue 2 players
People from Batna Province
JS Kabylie players
Association football midfielders
21st-century Algerian people
USM Khenchela players